This is the discography of American singer Bethany Joy Lenz, documenting albums, singles and music videos released by Lenz. Lenz released her first album at the age of 21, after her exit from the soap Guiding Light. She then experienced success with her second album produced by her friend Jeff Cohen and sold during the OTH tour in which she performed with some co-stars from One Tree Hill. Her third album, produced by Ron Aniello, never came to life due to changes behind the label Epic Records. She then teamed up with her friend Amber Sweeney to create the duet Everly in 2008. After three albums and four years of collaboration, the band split. Soon after that, Lenz released her fourth solo album produced once again by her friend Ron Aniello, and sold during the "Rock the Schools" Concert. A year later Jeff Cohen produced her fifth solo album which was sold to attendees of the One Tree Hill Convention "From Wilmington to Paris" and later 500 autographed first edition copies of the CD were sold on Etsy. In 2015, she released a sneak peek EP of an upcoming album through Kickstarter but the hard copies promised to the backers were sent 2 years later, and the full album never came to life due to legal proceedings with the creator of the project. She then teamed up with artists Daniel Shyman & Doo Crowder to release two songs for Christmas 2015. And they went on tour during summer 2016 under the name of "Joy Lenz and the Fire pit Band". On December 16, 2020 she released her first solo Christmas EP entitled "Snow" produced by Mike Bundlie and released by Poets Road Records.

Albums

Studio albums

EPs

Preincarnate

Preincarnate is a limited edition album released by Bethany Joy Lenz. The album, released in 2002, featuring eight original tracks, were all performed and written by Lenz. This album is no longer available for purchase or distribution.

Track listing
 "Overpopulated"
 "1972"
 "Day After Today"
 "Honestly"
 "Josiah"
 "Don't Walk Away"
 "Las Palmas"
 "Mr. Radioman"

Come on Home

Come on Home is the second studio album released by Bethany Joy Lenz that features five tracks performed by Lenz. Included is a cover titled "Leaving Town Alive" originally performed and written by Pancho's Lament (the alter-ego of New York-based songwriter/producer Jeff Cohen). The four remaining songs included in this album are written by Lenz. 
The album was sold in limited edition during the OTH Tour in March 2005.

Track listing
 "Songs in My Pockets"
 "Leaving Town Alive" Originally by: Pancho's Lament
 "Crazy Girls"
 "Sunday Train"
 "If You're Missing (Come on Home)" Bonus Track

The Starter Kit

The Starter Kit was to make Lenz's Epic Records debut with the release of her full-length album in early 2006, but was dropped due to changes behind the label.

Bethany Joy Lenz released her full length version of "Shiver" for the water in Kenya on her blog.

Track listing
 "Songs in My Pockets"
 "Devil Archerist"
 "Then Slowly Grows (Come to Me)"
 "Sunday Storm"
 "Never Gonna Be (C'mon C'mon)"
 "Quicksand"
 "Shiver"
 "Blue Sky" Originally by: Patty Griffin
 "Desperate Gown"
 "Patient Man"

Mission Bell

Mission Bell – EP – Everly was a girl group composed of One Tree Hill actress Bethany Joy Lenz and her music partner and friend Amber Sweeney who teamed up and released their debut EP entitled "Mission Bell". The EP is an eclectic mix of country, folk and pop rock sounds. The EP features three original tracks, all performed and written by Lenz and Sweeney. "Home is Me – You are Mine" is dedicated to troops overseas. Four 1950s songs were later listed on the EP after they were featured on One Tree Hill in season six.

iTunes track listing
 "Home is Me – You are Mine"
 "Stars"
 "Little Children"
 "Mrs. Scott" From One Tree Hill
 "Scheming Stars" From One Tree Hill
 "Hotel Café" From One Tree Hill
 "Karen's Café" From One Tree Hill

Hard copy track listing
 "Home is Me – You are Mine"
 "Stars"
 "Little Children"
 "The Sweetest Thing"
 "Mrs. Scott"
 "Scheming Stars"
 "Hotel Café" Original track
 "Karen's Café" Bonus track

Fireside

Fireside – EP is an acoustic Holiday EP released by Everly on iTunes and cdbaby.com.

Track listing
 "Sleigh Ride"
 "Winter Wonderland"
 "I'll Be Home for Christmas"
 "Christmas Time is Here"
 "O Come, O Come Emmanuel"
 "Have Yourself a Merry Little Christmas/O Holy Night"

B Tracks

B Tracks: Full Collection by Everly. Three volumes were released separately from 2009 to 2010 on cdbaby.com and iTunes. Later all B Tracks merged into one EP.

Vol. 1 – Single
 "Quicksand"
Released September 14, 2009.

Vol. 2 – Single
 "Maybe"
Released November 9, 2009.

Vol. 3 – EP
 "Flying Machine"
 "Girl in the Moon"
 "We Belong" Originally by: Pat Benatar
Released January 18, 2010.

Then Slowly Grows

Then Slowly Grows is the fourth studio album, (but the third that is released due to the issues that came with her third, "The Starter Kit") released by Bethany Joy Lenz that features nine tracks performed by Lenz. Included on Lenz's fourth studio album are two covers titled "Blue Sky" and "Queen of Wishful Thinking", (King of Wishful Thinking, that was one of her live performances from One Tree Hill Tour in 2005). The seven remaining songs included in this album are written by Lenz. Although "Shiver" is co-written with Ron Aniello and "Anybody Else" is co-written with Ron Aniello and Jason Wade.

The album was released during Rock the Schools Concert and portion of the proceeds benefited the Fender Music Foundation and the victims of Hurricane Sandy.
The CDs were damaged and the manufacturer refused to burn new discs and send them out, however a link was created for a digital download purchase.

Track listing
 "Devil Archerists"
 "Anybody Else"
 "Desperate Gown"
 "One Man to Love"
 "Shiver"
 "Blue Sky" Originally by: Patty Griffin
 "Queen of Wishful Thinking" Originally by: Go West
 "Sunday Storm"
 "Then Slowly Grows"

Your Woman

Your Woman is the fifth studio album, but kind of also her first full-length album. It's a little bit classic country, a little bit indie rock and a little bit 60's soul pop. All songs are written by Lenz, except "Blue Moon and Fireworks" which is written by Jeff Cohen, Matreca Berg & Kristian Bush. Though these songs are co-written: "Wicked Calamity Jane", "Father Knows Best" and "Your Woman" with Jeff Cohen and "Early Water" with Jeff Cohen & Wes Ramsey.

It was due to be released independently by Lenz on her Official Blog. Before it was released, Lenz sold hard copies to attendees of the One Tree Hill Convention – From Wilmington to Paris on October 19 and 20, 2013.

Lenz later sold 500 autographed first edition copies of the CD on Etsy under the name WishYouWereHereShop as a collector's item. Along with the album, Lenz sent out bonus items to randomly selected buyers. The items included: signed One Tree Hill cast photos, mini autographed holiday photo cards, autographed DVD sets and handwritten thank you cards.

Track listing
 "Wicked Calamity Jane"
 "Father Knows Best"
 "Please"
 "I Know" Featuring: Nikhil d'Souza
 "Early Water"
 "Your Woman"
 "Blue Moon and Fireworks"

Get Back to Gold

Get Back to Gold is a four titled track EP, credited as "Joy". The project was a sneak peek for her upcoming album and was funded by a Kickstarter Campaign with backers earning different rewards for supporting the project. A portion of proceeds from the sales had to go directly to Stop the Traffik's Chocolate Campaign.

Three songs were released exclusively on December 18 to all the backers and released on iTunes and Amazon on December 23. The final song "Get Back to Gold" was not completed in time for the release, so it was delayed and added later to the EP. It was released March 29 to the backers and on iTunes and Amazon on April 10, credited as "Bethany Joy Lenz". All songs written by Lenz, Dru DeCaro, and Raycee Jones.

Track listing
 "You Belong to Me"
 "Get Back to Gold"
 "Call of the Wild"
 "Start it Up"

It's Christmas

It's Christmas is a two title track EP collaboration between Bethany Joy Lenz, Daniel Shyman & Doo Crowder. "Listen" is written by Lenz herself.

Track listing
 "Listen (It's Christmas)"
 "I'll Be Home for Christmas" Featuring: Doo Crowder

Snow

Snow is a six title track EP with four original songs by Bethany Joy Lenz, credited as Bethany Joy and Produced by Mike Bundlie. It was released under Poets Road Records and first announced on Instagram.

Track listing
 "Snow"
 "Jingle Bells"
 "My Christmas with You" Featuring: Anthony Evans
 "My Favorite Things"
 "Rejoice"
 "Listen" Featuring: Maria Rose

Singles

Televised performances

Live performances

Miscellaneous songs
 "The Loneliness is Better Near Now" Was released on her old music site back in 2005, April 13
 "One More Thing" Released by Bethany herself on her old music site back in 2005, April 13
 "Ophelia" Released on September 14, 2005 as she was stuck inside waiting out hurricane Ophelia
 "Troublesome Tongue" An exclusive track from "The Notebook" Musical | Released November 5, 2010 on mymusicstream, by Bethany herself as a thank you reward to her fans for supporting the organization 'Love 146' which raises awareness on child sex trafficking
 "Street Where You Live" Originally From: 1956 Broadway Musical "My Fair Lady" | An Easter treat for her fans on her blog – April 24, 2011
 "It Happens" Released on August 5, 2011 | Video Karaoke of Sugarland's "It Happens" for HelloGiggles
 "It's Magic" Released on September 29, 2011 on SoundCloud
 "Someone to Watch Over Me" Released on April 8, 2012 on WhoSay | Video Karaoke for her Novel, Diamond Gothic
 "Lullaby" Released on June 21, 2012 on WhoSay | "Just a little lullaby for the night drifters"

References 

Folk music discographies
Pop music discographies
Discographies of American artists